Kucherov (from кучер meaning coachman) is a Russian masculine surname, its feminine counterpart is Kucherova. It may refer to
Aleksandr Kucherov (born 1995), Belarusian football player 
Nikita Kucherov (born 1993), Russian ice hockey right winger 
Pavel Kucherov (born 1964), Russian football coach 
Sergey Kucherov (born 1980), Russian track cyclist
Stepan Kucherov (1902–1973), Soviet naval officer
Valeriy Kucherov (born 1993), Ukrainian football player

Russian-language surnames